The Alibi, also known as Alibi Restaurant and Lounge and Alibi Tiki Lounge, is a restaurant and tiki bar located in Portland, Oregon's Overlook neighborhood, in the United States. The restaurant was established in 1947.

Reception
Alibi won in the "Best Karaoke" category of Willamette Week "Best of Portland Readers' Poll 2020".

See also
 List of restaurants in Portland, Oregon

References

External links

 
 
 
 
 

1947 establishments in Oregon
Overlook, Portland, Oregon
Restaurants established in 1947
Restaurants in Portland, Oregon
Tiki bars